Roberto Simón Marina (born 28 August 1961) is a Spanish retired footballer who played as a midfielder.

Over 11 seasons, he amassed La Liga totals of 265 games and 45 goals, with Atlético Madrid and Mallorca.

Club career
Born in Villanueva de la Serena, Province of Badajoz, Marina started his professional career with Atlético Madrid, being definitely promoted to the first team for the 1982–83 season and scoring five goals in 25 games as they finished in third position in La Liga. With the Colchoneros, he won the Copa del Rey in 1985 and was subsequently a starter in the 1986 European Cup Winners' Cup Final, lost 0–3 to FC Dynamo Kyiv.

After amassing 315 official appearances with the Madrid side, with the honour of scoring their 3,000th league goal on 14 January 1990, Marina finished his 15-year career with spells with RCD Mallorca and CD Toledo (the latter in the second division), retiring at the age of nearly 34. He began a manager career soon after, starting with his last team then moving to CD Ourense, always as an assistant; he subsequently returned to Atlético, being charged with the youth sides and the C-team in the fourth level.

Marina returned to assistant manager duties under his mentor as a player at Atlético Luis Aragonés, which brought him to the staff in 2001. After two seasons he aided another coach, José Murcia, at Atlético B, continuing to work with the latter in the following years.

International career
After regular performances for Atlético, Marina earned his first (and only) cap for Spain: on 26 May 1985 he played six minutes in a friendly with the Republic of Ireland, in Cork.

Honours
Atlético Madrid
Copa del Rey: 1984–85; Runner-up 1986–87
Supercopa de España: 1985
UEFA Cup Winners' Cup: Runner-up 1985–86

Mallorca
Copa del Rey: Runner-up 1990–91

References

External links

1961 births
Living people
People from Villanueva de la Serena
Sportspeople from the Province of Badajoz
Spanish footballers
Footballers from Extremadura
Association football midfielders
La Liga players
Segunda División players
Segunda División B players
Atlético Madrid B players
Atlético Madrid footballers
RCD Mallorca players
CD Toledo players
Spain youth international footballers
Spain under-21 international footballers
Spain under-23 international footballers
Spain amateur international footballers
Spain international footballers
Spanish football managers
Atlético Madrid B managers